Nico Lauenstein (born 12 January 1986) is a German footballer who plays as a goalkeeper for Grün-Weiß Amisia Rheine.

Career
Lauenstein made his professional debut for Eintracht Braunschweig in the 3. Liga on 4 March 2009, coming on as a substitute in the 68th minute for Jasmin Fejzić in the 1–2 away loss against Rot-Weiß Erfurt.

References

External links
 Profile at DFB.de
 Profile at kicker.de
 Eintracht Braunschweig II statistics at Fussball.de
 Goslarer SC statistics at Fussball.de
 MTV Wolfenbüttel statistics at Fussball.de
 SV Rot-Weiß Hörden statistics at Fussball.de

1986 births
Living people
People from Osterode am Harz
Footballers from Lower Saxony
German footballers
Association football goalkeepers
Eintracht Braunschweig II players
Eintracht Braunschweig players
Goslarer SC 08 players
3. Liga players
Regionalliga players